is a Japanese figure skating choreographer, coach, and former competitive ice dancer. He skated with Rie Arikawa, winning two Japanese national titles, and then with Nakako Tsuzuki. During his career, he competed at a total of ten ISU Championships.

Career 
Miyamoto began learning to skate in 1988.

Partnership with Arikawa 
He teamed up with Rie Arikawa no later than 1995. After winning the Japanese junior title, they were sent to the 1996 World Junior Championships in Brisbane, Australia, where they finished 22nd. The following season, they placed second at the Japan Junior Championships. They regained their national junior title before placing 16th at the 1998 World Junior Championships in Saint John, New Brunswick, Canada.

Advancing to the senior ranks, Arikawa/Miyamoto competed at their first Grand Prix events and became the national silver medalists in the 1998–1999 season. They took silver at the Asian Winter Games in South Korea and placed 9th at the 1999 Four Continents Championships in Canada.

In the 2001–2002 season, Arikawa/Miyamoto won their first senior national title and then placed 8th at the Four Continents Championships in Jeonju, South Korea. Making their only World Championships appearance, they qualified to the free dance and finished 24th overall in Nagano, Japan.

Arikawa/Miyamoto repeated as national champions the following season. In February 2003, they won the bronze medal at the Asian Winter Games in Aomori, Japan, and placed 8th at their final competition, the Four Continents Championships in Beijing, China. They were coached by Muriel Zazoui, Pasquale Camerlengo, Romain Haguenauer in Lyon, France.

Partnership with Tsuzuki 
Later in 2003, Miyamoto formed a partnership with Nakako Tsuzuki. During their three-season partnership, they competed together at six Grand Prix events and placed in the top ten at three Four Continents Championships. They were coached by Muriel Zazoui in Lyon, France.

They both retired from competitive skating following the 2005–2006 season.

Post-competitive career 
Miyamoto became a choreographer for ice shows and competitive skaters. He has choreographed for Shizuka Arakawa, Daisuke Takahashi, Akiko Suzuki, Shoma Uno, Yuzuru Hanyu, Keiji Tanaka, Choi Da-bin, as well as the figure skating anime Yuri on Ice.

Programs

With Tsuzuki

With Arikawa

Results 
GP: Grand Prix

With Tsuzuki

With Arikawa

References

External links

 
 

Japanese male ice dancers
Figure skating choreographers
1978 births
Living people
People from Himeji, Hyōgo
Asian Games medalists in figure skating
Figure skaters at the 1999 Asian Winter Games
Figure skaters at the 2003 Asian Winter Games
Medalists at the 1999 Asian Winter Games
Medalists at the 2003 Asian Winter Games
Asian Games silver medalists for Japan
Asian Games bronze medalists for Japan
Competitors at the 2001 Winter Universiade